Jacobus de Belviso  (c. 1270 – 1335) was an Italian jurist from Bologna. His later reputation was based on the text Practica criminalis on criminal law printed under his name in 1515. This is, however, no longer believed to be his work.

Works 
Lectura Authenticorum, Lyon 1511.
Practica criminalis, Lyon 1515.

Notes

External links

  

1270s births
1335 deaths
14th-century Italian jurists
Academic staff of the University of Perugia